Methylphosphinic acid is a monobasic acid, the simplest of the phosphinic acids. A central phosphorus atom is connected to a hydroxy group, a hydrogen atom, a methyl group and an oxygen. Derivatives of methylphosphinic acid can have the phosphorus connected hydrogen atom replaced by other organic groups. In early days what is now called methylphosphonic acid was also called methylphosphinic acid.

Production
Methylphosphinic acid can be produced by the hydrolysis of dimethyl methylphosphonate, which is conveniently obtained from trimethylphosphite.

Hydrolysis of methyldichlorophosphine yields methylphosphinic acid, 

Methylphosphinic acid is a common byproduct of the hydrolysis of various CH3P-containing esters and amides, as occur in pesticides for example.

Properties
Rat oral  value for methylphosphinic acid is 940 mg/kg.

Derivatives
(1,2,5,6-Tetrahydropyridin-4-yl)methylphosphinic acid TPMPA
N-methylaminomethane-P-methylphosphinic acid or N-methylamino-methyl-methylphosphinic acid
Ethane-1,2-diylbis(methylphosphinic acid)
(3-amino-2-hydroxypropyl)methylphosphinic acid
Methylphosphinic acid ethyl ester  (CAS number 16391-07-4)
dimethylphosphoryloxy-methylphosphinic acid
 N,N-dimethylaminomethane-P-methylphosphinic acid
(Aminomethyl)methylphosphinic acid 15901-11-8
(2-aminobenzyl)-methylphosphinic acid
(6-amino-3-ethyl-1H-benzimidazol-3-ium-2-yl)-methylphosphinic acid
[(2S,3S)-3-(methoxymethyl)pentan-2-yl]oxy-methylphosphinic acid
(3-Aminocyclopentyl)methylphosphinic acid
methylene-di(methylphosphinic acid)

References

Phosphinic acids
Organic compounds with 1 carbon atom